Camp Unplug was a series of thirty-six Vines which follow thirteen Viners who grudgingly attend a "digital detox camp", filmed at Camp Wandawega. Described as Vine's "first long-form original series", Camp Unplug was released on June 23, 2016, during VidCon, after the six-second limit on Vines were lifted. It was soon looped over 41 million times the following week. It was twenty-two minutes in length. Camp Unplug was written by Viners Aaron Chewning and Chris Melberger, and produced by Jeremy Cabalona and Karyn Spencer. The series was where future collaborators Drew Gooden and Danny Gonzalez first met.

Camp Unplug received three nominations at the 6th Streamy Awards and was a finalist for Web Series at the 9th Shorty Awards.

Cast 

 Demetrius Harmon (MeechOnMars)
 Lauren Giraldo
 Danny Gonzalez
 Cody Ko
 Kenny Knox
 Mikaela Long
 Emily Fan (Not Even Emily)
 Chloe Woodard (Chloe LMAO)
 Dope Island
 Tom Harlock
 Victor Pope Jr.
 Drew Gooden
 Miel Bredouw (Miel Monster)

Accolades

References

External links 

 Camp Unplug on YouTube
 

2016 web series debuts